Busir or Bazir (  688–711) was the Khazar khagan in the late 7th century and early 8th century.

In 704 Justinian II, who had been exiled at Chersonesos for nine years, arrived at Busir's court. Busir, perhaps seeking to use him in his political maneuverings with the Byzantine Empire, welcomed Justinian and gave him his sister in marriage (the woman's Khazar name is unknown, but she took the baptismal name of Theodora). Busir provided the couple with funds and a house in Phanagoria.

However, the winds of realpolitik soon shifted, and the new emperor, Tiberius III, offered Busir a substantial bounty for his brother-in-law's head. Busir dispatched two agents, Balgitzin and Papatzys, to kill Justinian, but the latter was warned by his wife, who bribed the assassins' slaves to learn the nature of their mission. Turning the tables on his would-be killers, Justinian murdered the pair after a banquet and fled Phanagoria by ship, seeking aid from Khan Tervel of Bulgaria, with whose help he retook Constantinople.

Busir now attempted to make peace with Justinian, sending Theodora to Constantinople. He later became involved with, possibly instigating, a revolt by Justinian's officers in the Crimea, which led ultimately to the crowning of Philippikos Bardanes as emperor and the death of Justinian in 711.

References 

7th-century births
7th-century rulers in Europe
7th-century Turkic people
8th-century deaths
8th-century rulers in Europe
8th-century Turkic people
Khazar rulers